Honggang District is a district of the city of Daqing, Heilongjiang province, People's Republic of China.

Administrative divisions 
Honggang District is divided into 5 subdistricts and 1 township. 
5 subdistricts
 Honggang, Babaishang, Xingnan, Jiefang, Chuangye
1 town
 Xingshugang

Notes and references 
 Administrative Division Code : 230605,Post Code : 163511, Phone Area Code :0459, The Prefix of Motor Vehicle License Plate : 黑E, The Prefix of Citizen Identity Card Number: 230605

External links
  Government site - 

Honggang
Daqing